The Remington Model 750 was a semi-automatic rifle and successor to earlier semi-automatic rifles Remington Model 740, Remington Model 742 and Remington Model 7400. Production began in 2006 and discontinued in 2015.

Magazines up to 10 rounds are available.

Variants
Since its introduction in 2006, the Model 750 has been offered in two main variants.
Model 750 Woodsmaster
Introduced in 2006, the Woodsmaster features an improved gas-operated action as well as a walnut stock and fore-end. It also had swivel studs for mounting a sling.
Model 750 Synthetic
The Synthetic model, introduced in 2007, is identical to the Woodsmaster except that it features a synthetic stock and fore-end. And some of the synthetic variants have attached magazines.

References 

Remington Arms firearms
Rifles of the United States